P'ungsŏ County is a kun, or county, in Ryanggang province, North Korea.  It was formed after the division of Korea from portions of Kimhyŏnggwŏn (then P'ungsan) and Kapsan counties.

Geography
Lying atop the southern portion of the Kaema Plateau, P'ungsŏ is heavily mountainous. In general, the mountains are higher in the northwest and lower toward the southeast. They include the Puksubaek range; the highest point is Puksubaeksan itself. The chief rivers are the Hŏch'ŏn and the Nŭnggwi (능귀강).  P'ungsŏ Lake, an artificial reservoir, lies in the middle of the county. Some 91% of P'ungsŏ's area is covered with forestland.

Administrative divisions
P'ungsŏ county is divided into 1 ŭp (town), 3 rodongjagu (workers' districts) and 17 ri (villages):

Economy
Logging is the chief industry in P'ungsŏ.  There is little agriculture, due to the rugged terrain. However, some amounts of maize, potatoes, and wheat are produced on dry-field farms; livestock are also raised. The county is known for the production of bracken fern. The county is home to deposits of gold, lead and zinc.

Transportation
The county is served by road, but not by rail. The Nŭnggwi River and P'ungsŏ Lake are used to transport raw lumber downstream.

See also
Geography of North Korea
Administrative divisions of North Korea
Ryanggang

References

External links

Counties of Ryanggang